The Spanish Federation of Underwater Activities (FEDAS) is the governing body in the field of Spanish aquatic sports. As of 2020, the federation has 909 registered clubs and 30,444 federated athlets.

It is a voting member of the Confédération Mondiale des Activités Subaquatiques (CMAS) .

History
After World War II, there was a large increase in underwater sports in Spain, including scuba diving and spear fishing. In response, The National Office of Physical Education and Sports (the official body governing sports in Spain at that time) ordered the creation of "The Underwater Activities Committee" in 1947. The organization was initially integrated into the Spanish Federation of Fishing, taking the name of the Spanish Federation of Fishing and Underwater.

In 1959, the CMAS Underwater Committee along with other National Federations took part in the creation of a new international organization. In March 1967, due to the extraordinary importance reached by underwater activities in Spain, the Committee became independent from the Fisheries Federation, taking the name of the Spanish Federation of Underwater Activities (FEDAS).

Today it is the official body that governs spearfishing, scuba diving, finswimming, underwater orienteering, underwater photography, Underwater Hockey, Diving and Underwater Rugby competitions in Spain. In addition to recreational diving, Spain has numerous schools which organize scuba diving expeditions to further underwater archaeological research. The first autonomous immersion Spanish club (CRIS) was founded in 1952 in Barcelona. Since then, the number of Clubs and Centres has increased dramatically.

Beyond scuba diving, other activities such as swimming with fins and underwater orientation have been developed, including participation in international competition. There have also been great achievements in underwater photography, with people like Xavier Safont, Carlos Minguell, Carles Virgili or Jose Luis Gonzalez, among others, having reached the highest podium of the World Championship of Underwater Photography.

Other recently invented underwater sports such as Underwater Hockey, Underwater Rugby and Sport Diving competitions, are beginning to grow internationally as well.

Organization 
FEDAS is currently organised into nine sports committees, a technical committee and three departments.

Sports committees
 Apnea
 Hunting photo apnea
 Sport Diving
 Underwater Hockey
 Underwater Photo and Video.
 Finswimming
 Underwater orienteering
 Spearfishing
 Underwater Rugby

Technical Committee
The Technical Committee oversees the operation of the FEDAS diver training program (known as the National Diving School or Escuela Nacional De Buceo Deportivo).

Departments
 Judges and referees.
 Medical Committee.
 Scientific Diving.

Regional Federations
Each autonomous community (including the autonomous cities of Ceuta and Melilla) has its own federation. These federations operate their own administrations and organize their own competitions, but must adhere to state regulations from the Spanish Federation is. The regional federations are:

 Andalusia.
 Aragon.
 Balerares.
 Canary.
 Cantabria.
 Castile and León.
 Castilla-La Mancha.
 Catalonia.
 Valencia.
 Ceuta.
 Extremadura.
 Galicia.
 Community of Madrid.
 Melilla.
 Navarra.
 Asturias.
 Region of Murcia.
 Basque Country.

Delegations
 Rioja

References

External links
 FEDAS website
 FEDAS Finswimming Committee webpage
 Club Nautico 'Delphis Goat Club' Andalucía – host of several national championships

Diving organizations
Underwater sports organizations
Sports governing bodies in Spain
Underwater hockey governing bodies
Finswimming
Underwater rugby
Underwater orienteering
Diver organizations